In Your Eyes may refer to:

Film
 In Your Eyes, a 2004 film featuring Michael DeLorenzo
 In Your Eyes (2010 film), a Philippine romantic drama
 In Your Eyes (2014 film), a film written by Joss Whedon and directed by Brin Hill

Music

Albums
 In Your Eyes (D. Train album) or the title song, 1988
 In Your Eyes (George Benson album) or the title song (see below), 1983
 ...In Your Eyes, by Mary MacGregor, or the title song, 1978
 In Your Eyes (EP), by Gary Hughes, or the title song, 1998
 In Your Eyes, by Amberlife, 2004
 In Your Eyes, by Nutshell, 1976
 ...In Your Eyes, by Andy Fraser, 1975

Songs
 "In Your Eyes" (George Benson song), 1983
 "In Your Eyes" (Inna song), 2013
 "In Your Eyes" (Kylie Minogue song), 2002
 "In Your Eyes" (Niamh Kavanagh song), winner at Eurovision 1993
 "In Your Eyes" (Peter Gabriel song), 1986
 "In Your Eyes" (Robin Schulz song), 2020
 "In Your Eyes" (The Weeknd song), 2020
 "In Your Eyes", by Anastacia from Pieces of a Dream, 2005
 "In Your Eyes", by BadBadNotGood from IV, 2016
 "In Your Eyes", by Bucks Fizz, a B-side of the single "New Beginning", 1986
 "In Your Eyes", by Circle Jerks from Golden Shower of Hits, 1983
 "In Your Eyes", by Dionne Warwick from Dionne, 1979
 "In Your Eyes", by Jessie Ware from What's Your Pleasure?, 2020
 "In Your Eyes", by Joan Armatrading from What's Inside, 1995
 "In Your Eyes", by John Frusciante from Letur-Lefr, 2012
 "In Your Eyes", by John Norum from Face the Truth, 1992
 "In Your Eyes", by Rational Youth from Rational Youth, 1983
 "In Your Eyes", by Shaya, 2011
 "In Your Eyes", by Status Quo from In the Army Now, 1986
 "In Your Eyes", by Terry McDermott, 2013
 "In Your Eyes", by Tribal Seeds, 2011
 "In Your Eyes", by War from Deliver the Word, 1983

See also
 "It's in Your Eyes", a 1996 song by Phil Collins
 "It's in Your Eyes", a 2001 song by Sloan from Pretty Together
 In My Eyes (disambiguation)
 Into Your Eyes
 Your Eyes (disambiguation)